Jan Kadlec (born 19 July 1989) is a retired Czech football striker who last played for the Sparta Prague B.

References

External links
 at fotbalportal.cz

1989 births
Living people
Association football forwards
Czech Republic youth international footballers
Czech footballers
AC Sparta Prague players
FK Viktoria Žižkov players
FC DAC 1904 Dunajská Streda players
Slovak Super Liga players
Footballers from Prague
Expatriate footballers in Slovakia
Czech expatriate sportspeople in Slovakia